JHHS may refer to:

John Handley High School
John Hardin High School
John Hersey High School
Jonesboro-Hodge High School